The 2008–09 USC Trojans men's basketball team represented the University of Southern California during the 2008-09 NCAA Division I men's basketball season. The Trojans, led by 4th year head coach Tim Floyd, played their home games at the Galen Center and were members of the Pacific-10 Conference. They finished the season 22–13, 9–9 in Pac-10 play. They won the 2009 Pacific-10 Conference men's basketball tournament over Arizona State. They went to the 2009 NCAA Division I men's basketball tournament as a 10th seed, where they lost in the 2nd round to Michigan State.

Class of 2008 

|-
| colspan="7" style="padding-left:10px;" | Overall Recruiting Rankings:     Scout – 26     Rivals – 20       ESPN – UR 
|}

Roster

Schedule

|-
!colspan=12 style=|Regular season

|-
!colspan=12 style=| Pac-10 Conference tournament

|-
!colspan=12 style=| NCAA tournament

References

External links
Official Site

USC Trojans men's basketball seasons
Usc
Usc
USC Trojans
USC Trojans
Pac-12 Conference men's basketball tournament championship seasons